The 7th Beijing College Student Film Festival was held from 17 April to 9 May 2000 in Beijing, China.

Awards
 Best Film Award: Something About Secret
 Best Director Award: Lu Xuechang for A Lingering Face
 Best Actor Award: Jiang Wu for Shower
 Best Actress Award: Jiang Shan for Something About Secret
 Best Visual Effects Award: Crash Landing
 Best Supporting Actor Award
 Best Supporting Actress Award
 Best Newcomer Award: Pan Yueming for A Lingering Face
 Favorite Actor Award: Pu Cunxin for Shower
 Favorite Actress Award: Xu Fan for A Sigh
 Favorite Film: Shower
 Artistic Exploration Award: None
 Committee Special Award: Fight for Nanjing, Shanghai and Hangzhou, My 1919
 Special Jury Award: Roaring Across the Horizon
 Special Science and Education Film Award: Cosmos and Man
 Special Award for Child Actor: Cao Dan for Thatched Memories

References

External links

Beijing College Student Film Festival
2000 film festivals
2000 festivals in Asia
Bei